Albania has a variety of climate systems. With its coastline facing the Adriatic and Ionian seas in the Mediterranean sea, its highlands backed upon the elevated Balkan landmass, and the entire country lying at a latitude subject to a variety of weather patterns during the winter and summer seasons, however it has a high number of climatic regions for such a small area. The coastal lowlands have typically mediterranean climate while the highlands have a continental climate. In both the lowlands and the interior, the weather varies markedly from north to south.

Under the Köppen climate classification, the country has Hot Mediterranean climate, Warm Mediterranean climate, Subtropical climate, Oceanic climate, Continental climate and Subarctic climate.

Overview 

Summer temperatures average , humidity is low.

Inland temperatures are affected more by differences in elevation than by latitude or any other factor. Low winter temperatures in the mountains are caused by the continental air mass that dominates the weather in Eastern Europe and the Balkans. Northerly and northeasterly winds blow much of the time. Average summer temperatures are lower than in the coastal areas and much lower at higher elevations, but daily fluctuations are greater. Daytime maximum temperatures in the interior basins and river valleys are very high, but the nights are almost always cool.

Average precipitation is heavy, a result of the convergence of the prevailing airflow from the Mediterranean Sea and the continental air mass. Because they usually meet at the point where the terrain rises, the heaviest rain falls in the central uplands. Vertical currents initiated when the Mediterranean air is uplifted also cause frequent thunderstorms. Many of these storms are accompanied by high local winds and torrential downpours.
When the continental air mass is weak, Mediterranean winds drop their moisture farther inland. When there is a dominant continental air mass, cold air spills onto the lowland areas, which occurs most frequently in the winter. Because the season's lower temperatures damage olive trees and citrus fruits, groves and orchards are restricted to sheltered places with southern and western exposures, even in areas with high average winter temperatures.

Nearly 95% of the rain falls in the winter.

Rainfall in the upland mountain ranges is heavier. The seasonal variation is not quite as great in the coastal area.

The higher inland mountains receive less precipitation than the intermediate uplands. Terrain differences cause wide local variations, but the seasonal distribution is the most consistent of any area.

See also   
 Geography of Albania
 Biodiversity of Albania

References

External links
Institute of Geo-science, Energy, Water, and Environment of Albania Official Website
Albania Extreme Weather Warnings by Meteo.al

 

Environment of Albania
Geography of Albania
Albania
Albania